Prairiewood Village is an unincorporated community and census-designated place (CDP) in Brown County, South Dakota, United States. It was first listed as a CDP prior to the 2020 census. The CDP had a population of 303 at the 2020 census.

Moccasin Creek flows southward through the CDP, part of the James River watershed. Moccasin Creek Country Club is in the southeast part of the CDP.

Demographics

References 

Census-designated places in Brown County, South Dakota
Census-designated places in South Dakota